Sir Roger Williams is a Welsh academic. He was vice-chancellor of the University of Reading from 1993 until 2002, and chair of Higher Education Funding Council for Wales from 2002 to 2008. He received a knighthood in June 2006 for his services to Higher Education.

Background and early life

Roger Williams was born in South Wales and grew up near Merthyr Tydfil, where he was educated at Tredegar Grammar School. He continued his studies at Worcester College, Oxford, where he became an Honorary Fellow in 1999.

References 

Year of birth missing (living people)
Living people
Welsh scholars and academics
Vice-Chancellors of the University of Reading
Knights Bachelor
People from Merthyr Tydfil
Alumni of Worcester College, Oxford